North Line may refer to:
Far North Line, Scotland
Gjøvik Line, Norway
Main North Line, New Zealand
Main North railway line, New South Wales, Australia
Milwaukee District/North Line, Illinois, United States
Northern line (underground railway), London, England
North Line, Chennai Suburban, India
North Line (METRORail), Houston, Texas, United States
North-Link Line, Taiwan
Nordbanen, Denmark
Sounder North Line, Washington, United States
Union Pacific/North Line, Illinois, United States
West North Line, Chennai Suburban, India

See also
Main North Line (disambiguation)
North-South Line (disambiguation)